The 2010–11 season of the Hessenliga was the third season of the league at tier five (V) of the German football league system.

Although the teams from the German state of Hesse made up the bulk of the clubs in the Hessenliga, the Bavarian side FC Bayern Alzenau played the 2010–11 season in the division as they are members of the Hessischer Fußball-Verband (HFV; Hessian Football Association). As league champions, they were directly promoted to the 2011–12 Regionalliga Süd. The three worst placed teams, Hünfelder SV, 1. FC Schwalmstadt and VfB Marburg, were relegated to their respective Verbandsligen and the 15th placed team, RSV Würges, lost in the playoffs to the runners-up of the three Verbandsligen and thus were also relegated.

League table

Play-offs 
The table of the promotion round, which was contested between the three Verbandsliga runners-up and the 15th placed Hessenliga team to determine one further spot in the Hessenliga for the following season:

External links 
 Hessischer Fußball-Verband – official website of the Hessian Football Association 

Hessenliga seasons
Hessen